Abrotanella scapigera is a member of the daisy family and is endemic species of northwest and south central Tasmania, Australia.

References

scapigera